is a train station in the city of Mizuho, Gifu Prefecture, Japan, operated by Central Japan Railway Company (JR Tōkai), with a freight terminal operated by the Japan Freight Railway Company.

Lines

Station layout
Hozumi Station has one elevated  island platform with the station building located underneath. The station has a Midori no Madoguchi staffed ticket office.

Platforms

Adjacent stations

|-
!colspan=5|Central Japan Railway Company

History
Hozumi Station opened on August 1, 1906. The station was absorbed into the JR Tōkai network upon the privatization of the Japanese National Railways (JNR) on April 1, 1987.

Station numbering was introduced to the section of the Tōkaidō Line operated by JR Central in March 2018; Hozumi Station was assigned station number CA76.

Passenger statistics
In fiscal 2016, the station was used by an average of 8227 passengers daily (boarding passengers only).

Surrounding area
Mizuho City Hall
Nagara River

See also
 List of Railway Stations in Japan

References

External links

  

Railway stations in Gifu Prefecture
Tōkaidō Main Line
Railway stations in Japan opened in 1906
Stations of Central Japan Railway Company
Stations of Japan Freight Railway Company
Mizuho, Gifu